The 1947 Southwestern Louisiana Bulldogs football team was an American football team that represented the Southwestern Louisiana Institute of Liberal and Technical Learning (now known as the University of Louisiana at Lafayette) in the Louisiana Intercollegiate Conference during the 1947 college football season. In their first year under head coach Gee Mitchell, the team compiled a 6–2 record.

Schedule

References

Southwestern Louisiana
Louisiana Ragin' Cajuns football seasons
Southwestern Louisiana Bulldogs football